Ketema Yifru (12 December 1929 – 14 January 1994) was a prominent Ethiopian diplomat and politician.

16th Foreign Minister of Ethiopia

Born by the slopes of Mount Gara Muleta, Harerghe province of Eastern Ethiopia, Ketema rose to the highest levels of Emperor Haile Selassie's government, including Foreign Minister between 1961 and 1970. He was a son of a farmer in rural Gara Muleta. He was among the very few young Ethiopians of farmer family background to rise to the position of high government rank through his educational achievement. He played an important role in the forming of the Organization of African Unity, the predecessor of the present-day African Union.

^ Education 
Hope College, United States of America, 1948-1951 Bachelor of Arts.  Boston University, United States of America, 1951-1952, Master of Arts in Political science and International relations.  Spoken languages: Amharic , English, French, Italian.
 
 ^ Careers
 Minister of Commerce, Industry & Tourism, Ethiopia, 1972-1974. Minister of Foreign Affairs, Ethiopia, 1961-1972.  Private Secretary to Emperor Haile Selassie, Ethiopia, 1958-1961.
Area Director for Eastern Africa, World Food Program since 1989. Africa Policy Advisor, World Food Programme, 1985-1989. 
  
Ketema also served in several ministries in the Aklilu Habte-Wold government. He was imprisoned without charge by the Derg regime form 1974-1982. Following his release, Ketema Yifru accepted a senior position with the United Nations agency, the World Food Programme. He died on January 14, 1994, in Addis Ababa, from pancreatic cancer. He was survived by his widow, Woizero Rahel Senegiorgis, and their four sons.

Honours 
 Knight Grand Cross of the Order of Isabella the Catholic (Spain, 27/04/1971).

Sources
Aberra Jembere: "Kätäma Yefru", in: S. Uhlig (ed.): Encyclopaedia Aethiopica, vol. 3 (2007).

References

External links
OAU

See also
 List of honorary British knights and dames

1929 births
1994 deaths
Deaths from cancer in Ethiopia
Deaths from pancreatic cancer
People from Addis Ababa
Honorary Knights Commander of the Order of St Michael and St George
Knights Grand Cross of the Order of Isabella the Catholic
Foreign ministers of Ethiopia
Government ministers of Ethiopia
World Food Programme people
Ethiopian officials of the United Nations
20th-century Ethiopian politicians